"ID; Peace B" is the debut single by South Korean single BoA from her debut studio album of the same title, released through SM Entertainment on August 25, 2000. In Japan, it was released through Avex Trax on May 30, 2001, and served as the lead single for her debut Japanese studio album Listen to My Heart (2002).

Meaning
In an interview BoA explained "ID; Peace B" stands for her ID name, which is BoA.

Music video

Korean version
The video starts off with BoA vocalizing, rehearsing the ID; Peace B dance and filming ID; Peace B. The video shows BoA dancing in various places. First with her backup dancers in a purple background, then by herself in a warehouse and in a Relativity-esque background.

Japanese version
The music video starts with BoA dancing in the dark with her backup dancers. The camera zooms out and reveals that BoA is watching herself on the TV. Throughout the video, BoA changes the channel and sees various commercials that features herself. At the start of the chorus BoA starts to sing the chorus. At the end, BoA starts to dance to the music and then it fades to black. A clip of her Korean music video for "Sara" is shown when BoA is flipping through the channels.

In popular culture
NCT members Mark, Jeno, Haechan, Jaemin, and Jisung, performed a dance to the song in  Mnet Show EXO 90:2014 in 2014 and Disney Channel Korea show Mickey Mouse Club in 2015, (then-know under the name  SM Rookies).

Track listing
Japanese CD single
 "ID; Peace B" – 3:53
 "Dreams Come True" (Ken Harada/Lyrics By Maki Mihara) – 4:54
 "ID; Peace B" (Instrumental) – 3:53
 "Dreams Come True" (Instrumental) – 4:54
 "ID; Peace B" (English Version) – 3:53

Credits and personnel 
Credits adapted from album's liner notes.

Studio 
 SM Booming System – recording, mixing, digital editing
 Sonic Korea – mastering

Personnel 

 SM Entertainment – executive producer
 Lee Soo-man – producer
 BoA – vocals
 Yoo Young-jin – producer, Korean lyrics, composition, arrangement, vocal directing, background vocals, recording, mixing, digital editing, strings conducting, music and sound supervisor
 Mai Matsumuro – Japanese lyrics
 Kim Hyun-ah – background vocals
 Lee Joon-hee – background vocals
 Jung Mi-young – background vocals
 Jeon Hoon – mastering
 Shim Sang-won – strings performing
 Yoo Chang-yong – assistant engineer
 Yoo Han-jin – assistant engineer

Charts

References

External links
BoA's ID; Peace B Japanese Music Video
BoA's ID; Peace B Korean Music Video

BoA songs
2001 debut singles
Japanese-language songs
Songs written by Yoo Young-jin
2000 songs
Avex Trax singles
South Korean synth-pop songs
Dance-pop songs
Torch songs